Io e Spotty is a 2022 Italian comedy film directed by .

Distribution 
The film was released in Italian cinemas on July 7, 2022.

Cast

References

External links
 

2020s Italian-language films
2022 comedy films
2022 films
Italian comedy films
2020s Italian films